Hollertoppen is a mountain in Heer Land at Spitsbergen, Svalbard. It has a height of 1,012 m.a.s.l., and is located between the glaciers of Bakaninbreen and Ragna-Mariebreen, north of Paulabreen. The mountain is named after Norwegian Minister of Industry Kjell Holler.

References

Mountains of Spitsbergen